Constance Song is a Singaporean actress, model and entrepreneur.

Career
Song was a model before joining Star Search Singapore in 1997 and was subsequently offered a contract by TCS (predecessor of MediaCorp). She made her television debut in the wuxia series The Return of the Condor Heroes. Song has also acted in several English television series on Channel 5, most notably Point of Entry. She joined SPH MediaWorks and later returned to MediaCorp when they merged in 2005.

After over 12 years in the industry, Song won her first accolade at the Star Awards 2010. She was named the Best Supporting Actress for her role as the villainous Jiang Ruolin in The Ultimatum.

In 2015, Song became the first artiste to join Li Nanxing's talent management agency.

Personal life
Song gave birth to a baby girl on 18 May 2017. Song also gave birth to her second girl on 9 March 2021.

Filmography

Accolades

References

External links
Profile on xin.msn.com

Singaporean television actresses
Living people
1975 births
20th-century Singaporean actresses
21st-century Singaporean actresses